Raymond "Ray" Carl Jackson (7 May 1928, Medora, Indiana – 7 April 2008, Lubbock, Texas) was an American botanist, known "for his work in cytogenetics, particularly on polyploidy, and for his discovery of low chromosome numbers in angiosperms."

Biography
After three years of service in the U.S. Army Air Forces/U.S. Air Force, Jackson matriculated in 1949 at Indiana University, where he graduated with bachelor's degree in 1952 and master's degree in 1953. In 1953 he became a graduate student at Purdue University, where he graduated in 1955 with Ph.D. in botany. From 1955 to 1958 he was a faculty member and herbarium curator at the University of New Mexico. In New Mexico he studied the dessert annual Xanthisma gracile (synonym Haplopappus gracilis) and found that it has "n=2 chromosomes, the lowest number ever reported for a plant." From 1958 to 1971 he was a professor of botany at the University of Kansas, where in 1969 he was appointed chair of the botany department. There he was also the chair of the interdepartmental Ph.D. program in genetics. In 1971 Jackson become the chair of the department of biological sciences at Texas Tech University. There he resigned as chair in 1978, was appointed Paul Whitfield Horn Professor in 1980, became professor emeritus in 1997, and continued his research as Horn Professor Emeritus until he died in 2008.

Jackson collected plants in the United States and Mexico. He began his Mexican collections in 1957 and continued through the 1970s. In the 1970s he became a leading expert in cytogenetics and plant biosystematics.

In 1947 in Brownstown, Indiana he married Thelma June (called "June") Snyder (b. 1929). They had a son and a daughter.

Eponyms
 (Asteraceae) Rayjacksonia (genus with at least 3 species)

Selected publications
 
 
 
 
 
 
 
 
 
 
 
 
 
 
 
  (See colchicine.)

References

External links
 

1928 births
2008 deaths
20th-century American botanists
21st-century American botanists
Plant geneticists
Indiana University alumni
Purdue University alumni
University of New Mexico faculty
University of Kansas faculty
Texas Tech University faculty
People from Jackson County, Indiana